Rowland Winn, 1st Baron St Oswald (19 February 1820 – 19 January 1893) was an English industrialist and Conservative Party politician.

He was instrumental in promoting and developing the ironstone ore fields in North Lincolnshire leading to the establishment of Scunthorpe as a national iron production center, and a key promoter of the Trent, Ancholme and Grimsby Railway.

Biography

The eldest son of Charles Winn of Nostell Priory, near Wakefield, he lived in the 1850s in another family property, Appleby Hall near Scunthorpe, and married Harriet Dumaresque.  Aware that the area had produced iron in Roman times, he searched for ironstone on his land, and found it in 1859. He marketed it to iron-makers, leased land for mining, mined his own ore and encouraged the building of iron works.

To transport the iron and to bring the coal necessary for the smelting, Winn campaigned for a railway to be built, which required the passage of an Act of Parliament. The Trent, Ancholme and Grimsby Railway opened in 1866, and Winn also built 193 houses in New Frodingham and enlarged the local school. Later, he financed the building of Scunthorpe Church of England School and St John's Church.

He was Member of Parliament (MP) for North Lincolnshire from 1868 to 1885, and served as a junior Lord of the Treasury (Government whip) in Disraeli's second government, from 1874 to 1880. He was Conservative Party Chief Whip from 1880 to 1885. Here he had to deal with Lord Randolph Churchill as his Forth Party. He was later ennobled as Baron Saint Oswald, of Nostell in the West Riding of the County of York in 1885, when the Conservatives were returned to power.

He returned to live at Nostell Priory when he inherited the house from his father in 1874, but his mother and unmarried sisters continued to live at Appleby.

His son Rowland (1857–1919) was MP for Pontefract from 1885 to 1893. His daughter Maud married Lt-General Alan Montagu-Stuart-Wortley. In 1897, Baron and Lady St. Oswald and their daughter Maud were guests at the Duchess of Devonshire's Diamond Jubilee Costume Ball. His daughter Laura married Valentine Lawless, 4th Baron Cloncurry, an Irish nobleman.

Arms

Notes

References

External links 
 

1820 births
Saint Oswald, Rowland Winn, 1st Baron
Conservative Party (UK) MPs for English constituencies
UK MPs 1868–1874
UK MPs 1874–1880
UK MPs 1880–1885
UK MPs who were granted peerages
1893 deaths
Peers of the United Kingdom created by Queen Victoria